Coach Trip 6 was the sixth series of Coach Trip in the United Kingdom. It was filmed from July until August 2010 (before the Arab Spring protests began) and aired from 14 February to 25 March 2011. The voting system rules reverted to those of earlier series. The length of this series was the same as the previous non-celebrity series but with weekends excluded. The tour visited Mediterranean countries like series 2 but with visits to Switzerland added for a month. Tour guide Brendan Sheerin, coach driver Paul Donald, narrator Dave Vitty and the coach with registration number MT09 MTT all returned for this series, which was aired on Channel 4 with a similar start to series 2 and a similar end to series 4.

Contestants

Contestants Notes (In Order of elimination and withdrawal)
Ruth & Steve, newly-wed husband and wife from Preston but originally from Glasgow, Scotland and on their honeymoon. First to leave due to being very unpopular because of their relentless moaning. (Original 7. Red-carded on Day 3.)
Jane & Jayne, two teachers and best friends from The Midlands (Original 7. Walked on Day 5 due to exhaustion from 0–3 star hotels and missing their children.)
Wendy & Darren, mother and son from Moreton, The Wirral. (Original 7. Red-carded on Day 5.)
Bob & Phil, best friends from Southampton. (Original 7. Walked at the beginning of Day 7 due to leg injury.)
Nav & Anna, husband and wife from Manchester. (Joined on Day 5 replacing Ruth & Steve. Red-carded on Day 7.)
David & Amanda, father and daughter from Yorkshire. (Joined on Day 6 replacing Wendy & Darren. Red-carded on Day 9.)
Jasmin & Rara, aunt and niece from Sheffield. (Joined on Day 6 replacing Jane & Jayne. Red-carded on Day 10 for bad behaviour and refusing to get out of bed, this result previously held by Alan & Lorenzo of series two.)
Mike & Shane, father and son from Ormskirk. (Joined on Day 11 replacing David & Amanda. Red-carded on Day 14.)
Mary & Darron, husband and wife from Chatham, but originally from East London. (Joined on Day 12 replacing Jasmin & Rara. Red-carded on Day 15.)
Barbara & Elaina, best friends from Central London, but originally from Uganda. (Original 7. Red-carded on Day 16.)
Andrew & Leah, friends from Liverpool. (Joined on Day 16 replacing Mike & Shane. Red-carded on Day 18.)
Alan & Gary, twins from Northern Ireland. (Joined on Day 18 replacing Barbara & Elaina. Red-carded on Day 20.)
Jaki & Janice, sisters from North London. (Joined on Day 17 replacing Mary & Darron. Red-carded on Day 22 for manipulating the previous days vote and canvassing for votes at the same time to be eliminated.)
Val & Margaret, friends from Newcastle. (Joined on Day 9 replacing Nav & Anna. Red-carded on Day 22.)
Karen & Ben, aunt and nephew from Essex. (Joined on Day 24 replacing Jaki & Janice. Red-carded on Day 25, after the announcement was made that whoever received the most votes that day would be instantly sent home despite whether they were currently on a yellow card or not.)
Wayne & Emma, partners for 7 years from ?. (Joined after lunch on Day 8 replacing Bob & Phil. Walked at the beginning of Day 29 due to ankle injury.)
Hilary & Terry, husband and wife from Workington, Cumbria. (Original 7. Lasted until Final Day.)
Rob & Timmy, students and best friends from Essex. (Original 7. Winners.)
Sarah & Lucy, friends from Newcastle. (Joined on Day 20 replacing Andrew & Leah. Lasted until Final Day.)
Shaun & Tom, students and friends from the University of Nottingham. (Joined on Day 22 replacing Gary & Alan. Lasted until Final Day.)
Sharon & Tressa, best friends from Morecambe. (Joined on Day 25 replacing Val & Margaret. Lasted until Final Day.)
David & Daniel, father and son from Coventry. (Joined on Day 28 replacing Karen & Ben. Lasted until Final Day.)

(Note: Contestants in italics yellow-carded without being voted off and left without being voted off).

Voting History

 Indicates that the couple received a yellow card
 Indicates that the couple was red carded off the trip
 Indicates that the couple were removed from the coach
 Indicates that the couple left the coach due to other reasons than being voted off or being removed from the coach
 Indicates that the couple was immune from any votes cast against them due to it either being their first vote or winning immunity from the vote
 Indicates that the couple were voted as the most popular couple and won series
 Indicates that the couple were voted as the second most popular couple
 Indicates that the couple were voted as the third most popular couple
 Indicates that the couple were voted as the fourth most popular couple

Notes
 Jasmine & Rara were removed with a red card on Day 10 for inappropriate behaviour during the previous night, including being drunk and disorderly, verbally abusing the hotel staff, doing a striptease in front of the hotel, and apparently damaging another guest's car. Moreover, they refused to get out of bed or admit any wrongdoing on the morning of Day 10, leading to their red card previously held by Alan & Lorenzo of series 2.
 Jaki & Janice were removed with a red card on Day 22 for overtaking the Day 21's vote and as they canvassed for votes during the day due to being tired and annoyed with their fellow passengers.
 On Day 25, due to the announcement of the red terror and the bullfighting activity, Brendan instated the voting rule previously introduced on Day 24 of series 3 and Day 5 of series 1 of celebrity coach trip - on vote time the couple who received the most votes would get an immediate red card, this happened to be Karen & Ben.
 Wayne & Emma walked at the beginning of Day 29 due to a foot injury.
No post-vote arrivals in series

The Trip Day-by-Day

References

2011 British television seasons
Coach Trip series
Television shows set in France
Television shows set in Gibraltar
Television shows set in Italy
Television shows set in Morocco
Television shows set in Portugal
Television shows set in Spain
Television shows set in Switzerland